Government Law College may refer to several institutions in India:

Karnataka
 Government Law College, Bangalore'''

Kerala
 Government Law College, Calicut
 Government Law College, Ernakulam
 Government Law College, Thiruvananthapuram
 Government Law College, Thrissur

Maharashtra
 Government Law College, Mumbai

Tamil Nadu
 Dr. Ambedkar Government Law College, Chennai
 Government Law College, Chengalpattu
 Government Law College, Coimbatore
 Government Law College, Madurai
 Government Law College, Tiruchirapalli
 Government Law College, Tirunelveli
 Government Law College, Vellore